Ribozyviria is a realm of satellite nucleic acids. Established in ICTV TaxoProp 2020.012D, the realm is named after the presence of genomic and antigenomic ribozymes of the Deltavirus type. Additional common features include a rod-like structure, a RNA-binding "delta antigen" encoded in the genome, and animal hosts. Furthermore, the size range of the genomes of these viruses is between around 1547–1735nt, they encode a hammerhead ribozyme or a hepatitis delta virus ribozyme, and their coding capacity only involves one conserved protein. Most lineages of this realm are poorly understood, the notable exception being members of the genus Deltavirus, the causal agents of Hepatitis D in humans.

This realm of viruses have an unclear origin. It has been proposed that they may have derived from retrozymes (a family of retrotransposons) or a viroid-like element (i.e. viroids and satellites) with capsid protein capture.

Taxonomy

Historical development 
The first taxa of this realm to receive acceptance by the ICTV is the species Hepatitis delta virus and its genus Deltavirus, in 1993. Deltavirus remained unassigned to any higher taxa until 2018, when the ICTV mistakenly classified Deltavirus within the then newly established realm, Riboviria. In 2019, this error was rectified and Deltavirus returned to its original position. In 2020, Hepatitis delta virus was abolished and replaced with eight new species, and the taxonomy developed to reach its current form, detailed below.

Current status 
Ribozyviria contains a single family, Kolmioviridae, with no intermediate taxa between realm and family. This family contains eight genera.

The names of all genera in this realm allude to the letter "D" in various languages. The family name comes from Finnish kolmio "triangle"; another reference to the Greek letter "Δ" (delta).

This taxonomy is shown hereafter:

 Realm: Ribozyviria
 Family: Kolmioviridae
 Genus: Daazvirus
 Species: Daazvirus cynopis [Chinese fire belly newt virus 1 (CFBNV-1), formerly amHDV] (host: Cynops orientalis)
 Genus: Dagazvirus
 Species: Dagazvirus schedorhinotermitis [rhinotermitid virus 1 (RTV-1), rHDV] (host: Schedorhinotermes intermedius)
 Genus: Daletvirus
 Species: Daletvirus boae [Swiss snake colony virus 1 (SwSCV-1), formerly sHDV] (host: Boa constrictor, Liasis mackloti savuensis)
 Genus: Dalvirus
 Species: Dalvirus anatis [dabbling duck virus 1 (DabDV-1), formerly avHDV] (host: Anas gracilis, A. castanea, A. superciliosa)
 Genus: Deevirus
 Species: Deevirus actinopterygii [ray-finned fish virus 1 (RFFV-1), formerly fHDV] (host: various Actinopterygii spp.)
 Genus: Deltavirus
 Species: Deltavirus cameroonense [human hepatitis delta virus 7 (HDV-7)] (host: Homo sapiens)
 Species: Deltavirus carense [human hepatitis delta virus 6 (HDV-6)] (host: H. sapiens)
 Species: Deltavirus italiense [human hepatitis delta virus 1 (HDV-1)] (host: H. sapiens)
 Species: Deltavirus japanense [human hepatitis delta virus 2 (HDV-2)] (host: H. sapiens)
 Species: Deltavirus peruense [human hepatitis delta virus 3 (HDV-3)] (host: H. sapiens)
 Species: Deltavirus senegalense [human hepatitis delta virus 8 (HDV-8)] (host: H. sapiens)
 Species: Deltavirus taiwanense [human hepatitis delta virus 4 (HDV-4)] (host: H. sapiens)
 Species: Deltavirus togense [human hepatitis delta virus 5 (HDV-5)] (host: H. sapiens)
 Genus: Dobrovirus
 Species: Dobrovirus bufonis [Chusan Island toad virus 1 (CITV-1), formerly tfHDV] (host: Bufo gargarizans)
 Genus: Thurisazvirus
 Species: Thurisazvirus myis [Tome's spiny-rat virus 1 (TSRV-1), formerly RDev] (host: Proechimys semispinosus)

See also 

 List of higher virus taxa
Retrozyme
Viroid

References

Further reading 

 

Viruses
Virus realms